Michael J. Pandolfo (born September 15, 1979 in Winchester, Massachusetts and raised in Burlington, Massachusetts) is an American retired professional ice hockey left wing.  He was drafted in the third round, 77th overall, by the Buffalo Sabres in the 1998 NHL Entry Draft.  The Sabres traded his rights to the Columbus Blue Jackets in a deal during the 2002 NHL Entry Draft.  He played three games in the National Hockey League during the 2003–04 season with the Blue Jackets, going scoreless.  Pandolfo played parts of two seasons as a member of the Lowell Devils, the AHL affiliate of New Jersey Devils, for whom his older brother Jay Pandolfo played. He retired after the 2007–08 season.

Career statistics

Regular season and playoffs

International

Awards and honors

References

External links

1979 births
Living people
American men's ice hockey left wingers
Binghamton Senators players
Boston University Terriers men's ice hockey players
Buffalo Sabres draft picks
Columbus Blue Jackets players
EHC München players
Ice hockey players from Massachusetts
Lowell Devils players
People from Burlington, Massachusetts
People from Winchester, Massachusetts
Reading Royals players
Sportspeople from Middlesex County, Massachusetts
Syracuse Crunch players
Trenton Titans players